Uruguayan Brazilian (Spanish: Uruguayo-brasileño, Rioplatense Spanish: Uruguayo-brasilero) is a Brazilian person of full, partial, or predominantly Uruguayan ancestry, or a Uruguayan-born person residing in Brazil.

History
Before the 1960s, the economy of Uruguay provided its citizens with middle-class affluence, and emigration was limited. With a comfortable standard of living, adequate employment opportunities, a favorable social welfare and health insurance system, and democratic freedoms, the need to leave was not pressing. On the whole, even the poorest of the Uruguayans enjoyed certain benefits that kept them satisfied enough to stay in their own country. For those who left the cultural and recreational opportunities of the cities, where 85 percent of all Uruguayans lived, the proposition of going to neighboring countries such as Argentina, with its familiar language and proximity to the home country, was more appealing than moving to Southern Brazil. Those who pursued business or educational opportunities in the Brazil and elsewhere, often returned home, never forsaking their Uruguayan citizenship.

Two factors changed the complacency of Uruguayans. First, there were economic and political problems in Uruguay after World War II, particularly money and employment crisis during the 1960s and 1970s. Second, an oppressive military regime took control of the government. Now, there were motivating factors to leave Uruguay, and the people leaving Uruguay in vast numbers were the ones that the country could least afford to lose—well-educated professionals and the young. This, too, marked the beginning of the social security crisis. As the aging population retired, and young people left the country, the burden on the country's financial resources grew. Of Uruguay immigrants from 1963 to 1975, 17.7 percent of them were aged 14 years or younger, 68 percent of them were between the ages of 15 and 39, and only 14.3 percent were over 40 years old. The continued employment problems of the late 1980s represented yet another impetus for the youth of Uruguay to seek employment and new lives elsewhere. Some of them went to the United States, but the largest population of Uruguayan emigrants continued to reside in Argentina and Brazil.

Modern estimates put the figure of Uruguayans in Brazil at about 55,000.

There are many thousands of Uruguayan citizens who also have Brazilian citizenship and vote in elections in both countries.

Notable people
César Charlone, cinematographer
Juan Figer, football agent
Emílio Garrastazu Médici, President of Brazil, was son of a Uruguayan-born woman
Giorgian de Arrascaeta, footballer

See also
 Brazil–Uruguay relations
 Emigration from Uruguay
 White Brazilian

References

Ethnic groups in Brazil
 
Brazil